The 2014 Australian Formula Ford Series was an Australian motor racing series open to Formula Ford and Formula Ford 1600 cars. It was the first national series for Formula Fords to be conducted in Australia following the withdrawal of national championship status from the Australian Formula Ford Championship by the Confederation of Australian Motor Sport (CAMS) at the end of 2013. The series was sanctioned by the CAMS with the first five rounds each staged at a Shannons Nationals Motor Racing Championships meeting. The Formula Ford Association Inc was appointed as the Category Manager by CAMS for this series.

The series was won by Thomas Randle, driving a Mygale.

Race calendar and results
The series was contested over six rounds with three races per round.

Points system
Points were awarded within each category on a 20-16-14-12-10-8-6-4-2-1 basis to the first ten finishers in each race. In addition, one point was awarded to the driver achieving the fastest lap time in qualifying in each category in each round.

Final standings

Australian Formula Ford Series (Fiesta powered cars)

Australian Formula Ford 1600 Series (Kent powered cars)

References

External links
 Formula Ford Association Inc.

Australian Formula Ford Series
Formula Ford